Kantallur is a village in Palakkad district of Kerala state, in India

References

Villages in Palakkad district